Lubiejewski is a Polish surname. Notable people with the surname include:

Stanisław Lubiejewski (born 1947), Polish athlete
Zbigniew Lubiejewski (born 1949), Polish volleyball player
Marcin Lubiejewski (born 1981), Polish volleyball player

Surnames of Polish origin